In rail transport, track force is the force acting on the tracks from a train and its axles based on the train's axle load in relation to acceleration and braking.

References

Rail infrastructure